Zlatko Krmpotić (born 7 August 1958) is a Serbian former player and manager.

Club career
Between 1977 and 1986, Krmpotić spent nine seasons with Red Star Belgrade, making over 200 appearances in all competitions and winning five major trophies. He then moved abroad to Turkey and spent two seasons with Gençlerbirliği (1986–1988). Before retiring from the game, Krmpotić played for AIK Bačka Topola in his homeland.

International career
At international level, Krmpotić represented Yugoslavia at the 1982 FIFA World Cup, making two appearances in the process, as the team finished third in Group 5. He previously won the UEFA European Under-21 Championship in 1978.

Managerial career
During his managerial career, Krmpotić worked at numerous clubs in 12 countries, namely Serbia and its predecessors (AIK Bačka Topola, OFK Beograd in three spells, and Obilić), Sweden (Degerfors IF), FYR Macedonia (Sloga Jugomagnat), Turkey (Ankaragücü), Greece (Paniliakos), Cyprus (Nea Salamis), Kazakhstan (Kairat), Kuwait (Kazma), DR Congo (Don Bosco), Zambia (ZESCO United), Botswana (Jwaneng Galaxy), and South Africa (Royal Eagles). He also led the Serbia and Montenegro U17s (2005), as well as the Serbia U19s (2007–2008). On February 9, 2022, he signed a contract with USM Alger. On April 17, 2022, he was sacked from USM Alger.

Personal life
Krmpotić is an ethnic Serbian Croat and holds Croatian citizenship. He is the brother-in-law of Serbian media magnate Željko Mitrović.

Honours

Club
Red Star Belgrade
 Yugoslav First League: 1979–80, 1980–81, 1983–84
 Yugoslav Cup: 1981–82, 1984–85

International
Yugoslavia
 UEFA Under-21 Championship: 1978

References

External links
 
 
 
 

1982 FIFA World Cup players
Association football defenders
Expatriate football managers in Botswana
Expatriate football managers in Cyprus
Expatriate football managers in Greece
Expatriate football managers in Kazakhstan
Expatriate football managers in Kuwait
Expatriate football managers in Sweden
Expatriate football managers in the Democratic Republic of the Congo
Expatriate football managers in North Macedonia
Expatriate football managers in Turkey
Expatriate football managers in Zambia
Expatriate footballers in Turkey
Expatriate soccer managers in South Africa
FK TSC Bačka Topola players
FK Obilić managers
FK Sloga Jugomagnat managers
Gençlerbirliği S.K. footballers
MKE Ankaragücü managers
Nea Salamis Famagusta FC managers
Polokwane City F.C. managers
OFK Beograd managers
Red Star Belgrade footballers
Red Star Belgrade non-playing staff
Serbia and Montenegro expatriate sportspeople in Cyprus
Serbia and Montenegro expatriate sportspeople in Greece
Serbia and Montenegro expatriate sportspeople in Sweden
Serbia and Montenegro expatriate sportspeople in Turkey
Serbian expatriate football managers
Serbian expatriate sportspeople in Botswana
Serbian expatriate sportspeople in South Africa
Serbian football managers
Serbian footballers
Croats of Serbia
Serbian SuperLiga managers
Footballers from Belgrade
Süper Lig players
Yugoslav expatriate footballers
Yugoslav expatriate sportspeople in Turkey
Yugoslav First League players
Yugoslav footballers
Yugoslavia international footballers
Yugoslavia under-21 international footballers
1958 births
Living people
Kazma SC managers
Kuwait Premier League managers
Serbian expatriate sportspeople in Kuwait
Serbian expatriate sportspeople in Kazakhstan